Johan Henrik Scheffel (9 April 1690 - 21 December 1781) was a Swedish artist. He became known for his portraits of Carl von Linné, Christopher Polhem and Hedvig Charlotta Nordenflycht.

References

Swedish artists
1690 births
1781 deaths